Training centre may refer to:

 Training centre, a place where any form of training takes place
 Training Centre, the Canadian name for a military training area